Matías Alejandro Vega (born 20 November 1995) is an Argentine professional footballer who plays as a goalkeeper for Deportivo Riestra.

Career
San Lorenzo were Vega's first club. After coming through the club's youth ranks, he was promoted into the first-team in 2008 and remained with San Lorenzo for three years but left in 2011 after not making an appearance for the club. His spell with San Lorenzo included two loan spells, the first was with Platense while the second was with Tiro Federal. After 25 appearances for the former and 34 for the latter, he returned to San Lorenzo and subsequently joined Instituto on a permanent transfer. Despite spending two seasons with Instituto, he made just four league appearances and left the club in July 2013.

Upon departing Instituto, he completed a move to Primera B Metropolitana club Atlanta. He went onto make 41 Primera B Metropolitana appearances for Atlanta in 2013–14. 2014 saw Vega move up a division as he completed a move to Primera B Nacional side Aldosivi. He made 6 appearances in his debut season for Aldosivi as the club won promotion into the 2015 Argentine Primera División. However, two years later Aldosivi were relegated back to Primera B Nacional; Vega had made nineteen appearances during the 2016–17 season. On 31 May 2019, Vega agreed a move to Deportivo Riestra ahead of the 2019–20 season.

Career statistics
.

Honours
Aldosivi
Primera B Nacional: 2017–18

References

External links

1995 births
Living people
Footballers from Rosario, Santa Fe
Argentine footballers
Association football goalkeepers
Primera Nacional players
Primera B Metropolitana players
Argentine Primera División players
San Lorenzo de Almagro footballers
Club Atlético Platense footballers
Tiro Federal footballers
Instituto footballers
Club Atlético Atlanta footballers
Aldosivi footballers
Deportivo Riestra players